Petr Kolmann (born September 20, 1988) is a Czech professional ice hockey defenceman. He is currently playing with the HC Bílí Tygři Liberec of the Czech Extraliga.

Kolmann made his Czech Extraliga debut playing with HC Bílí Tygři Liberec during the 2008–09 Czech Extraliga season.

References

External links

1988 births
Living people
Czech ice hockey defencemen
HC Benátky nad Jizerou players
HC Bílí Tygři Liberec players
Motor České Budějovice players
Sportspeople from Liberec